5011 Ptah is a near-Earth object and potentially hazardous asteroid of the Apollo group. It was discovered by astronomers with the Palomar–Leiden survey on 24 September 1960. It was named after the Ancient Egyptian deity Ptah.

Discovery 

Ptah was discovered on 24 September 1960, by Dutch astronomers Ingrid and Cornelis van Houten at Leiden, on photographic plates taken by Dutch–American astronomer Tom Gehrels at the Palomar Observatory in California. On the same night, the trio of astronomers also discovered the minor planets 1912 Anubis, 1923 Osiris and 1924 Horus, which were also named after Ancient Egyptian deities.

Palomar–Leiden survey 

The survey designation "P-L" stands for Palomar–Leiden, named after Palomar Observatory and Leiden Observatory, which collaborated on the fruitful Palomar–Leiden survey in the 1960s. Gehrels used Palomar's Samuel Oschin telescope (also known as the 48-inch Schmidt Telescope), and shipped the photographic plates to Ingrid and Cornelis van Houten at Leiden Observatory where astrometry was carried out. The trio are credited with the discovery of several thousand minor planets.

Naming 

This minor planet was named for the Egyptian creator deity Ptah. In Egyptian mythology, he is the creator of the universe and god of craftsmen and architects. The deity was generally represented in a human form with a sceptre and an ankh. The approved naming citation was published by the Minor Planet Center on 16 May 1992.

Classification and orbit 

Ptah orbits the Sun at a distance of 0.8–2.5 AU once every 2 years and 1 month (764 days). Its orbit has an eccentricity of 0.50 and an inclination of 7° with respect to the ecliptic. As no precoveries were taken, the asteroid's observation arc begins with its official discovery observation at Palomar.

It passes within that distance of Earth 15 times between 1900 and 2100, most recently on 21 January 2007, at 29.6 Gm. The next time will be in 2027 at 28.6 Gm. Due to its high eccentricity, Ptah is also a Mars-crosser.

Physical characteristics 

According to the "ExploreNEOs" Warm Spitzer program, Ptah is a rare Q-type asteroid, that belongs to the broader S-group of asteroids.

The Collaborative Asteroid Lightcurve Link assumes a standard albedo for stony asteroids of 0.20, and calculates a mean diameter of 1.6 kilometers using an absolute magnitude of 16.4. As of 2017, no rotational lightcurves have been obtained of Ptah, and its period and shape, as well as its spectral type remains unknown.

References

External links 
 Asteroid Lightcurve Database (LCDB), query form (info )
 Dictionary of Minor Planet Names, Google books
 Asteroids and comets rotation curves, CdR – Observatoire de Genève, Raoul Behrend
 
 
 

005011
005011
6743
Discoveries by Cornelis Johannes van Houten
Discoveries by Ingrid van Houten-Groeneveld
Discoveries by Tom Gehrels
Named minor planets
19600924
Ptah